Soto de San Esteban is a village in Soria, Spain. It is part of the municipality of San Esteban de Gormaz. The village had 116 inhabitants in 2010.

References

Populated places in the Province of Soria
Towns in Spain